The 3rd World Orienteering Championships were held in Eisenach/Friedrichroda, East Germany, in September 1970.

The championships had four events; individual contests for men and women, and relays for men and women.

The men's individual course had 19 controls over 14.5 kilometres, while the women's individual course had 10 controls over 7.5 kilometres.

Medalists

Results

Men's individual

Women's individual

References 

World Orienteering Championships
1970 in East German sport
International sports competitions hosted by East Germany
September 1970 sports events in Europe
Orienteering in East Germany